Glen Nissen (born 4 March 1966), nicknamed "Know-How", is an Australian former professional rugby league footballer who primarily played as a  or a winger.

Nissen played for at a club level for Penrith and the Canterbury Bankstown Bulldogs, plus Fulham RLFC (Heritage № 75) in England.

References

1966 births
Living people
Australian rugby league players
Canterbury-Bankstown Bulldogs players
London Broncos players
Penrith Panthers players
Rugby league fullbacks
Rugby league centres
Rugby league players from Sydney
Rugby league wingers